Reibekuchen are German potato pancakes, also known as Kartoffelpuffer. They are common in many areas of Germany, the name "Reibekuchen" being characteristic to the Rheinland area. Reibekuchen may be served with apple sauce, pumpernickel bread,  treacle, or with Maggi-brand seasoning sauce. They are often sold at street fairs and markets, such as Christmas markets in Germany.

As Riefkuukskes they are also considered to be a local dish in neighboring  Gelderland, The Netherlands.

See also 
 Potato pancake
 Korokke
 Croquette
 Popeyes

References 

Potato dishes
German cuisine
Rhenish cuisine
Cuisine of Wisconsin